USS Blakely may refer to the following ships of the United States Navy:

 , a torpedo boat commissioned in 1904 was named for Capt. Johnston Blakeley. The name was canceled in 1918 so that it could instead be assigned to Blakeley (DD-150).
 , a Wickes-class destroyer was named for Capt. Johnston Blakeley.
  (originally DE-1072), a Knox-class frigate was named for Captain Johnston Blakeley and Charles Adams Blakely.

See also
 

United States Navy ship names